The Dean of Hereford is the head (primus inter pares – first among equals) and chair of the chapter of canons, the ruling body of Hereford Cathedral. The dean and chapter are based at the Cathedral Church of Blessed Virgin Mary and St Ethelbert in Hereford. The cathedral is the mother church of the Diocese of Hereford and seat of the Bishop of Hereford.

List of deans

High Medieval
1140 Ralph
1150 Geoffrey
1157 Ralph
1173 Geoffrey
 Richard
1202 Hugh de Breusa
1207–1216 Hugh de Mapenor
1216 Henry
1218–1231 Thomas de Bosebir
1231–1234 Ralph de Maidstone
1234–? Stephen Thorne
1247–1262 Ancelin or Anselm
1271–1278 Giles de Avenbury
1278–1320 Jean de Aigueblanche

Late Medieval
1320–1352 Stephen de Ledebury
1352–1361 Thomas Trilleck
1361 William de Feriby
1363–? William Bermingham
?–1380 John de Middleton
1380–1393 John Harold
1393–1407 John Prophet
1407–1417 Thomas Felde
1422 John Bagshaw
?–1434 John Stanwey
1434–1445 Henry Shelford
1446–1462 John Berew

1463–1481 Richard Pede
1481–1490 Thomas Chaundler
1491–1491 Oliver King
1491–1501 John Hervey

Early modern
1503–? Reginald West
1512–1512 Thomas Wolsey
1513–1529 Edmund Frowcester
1529–1541 Gamaliel Clifton
1541–1555 Hugh Curwen
1558–1559 Edmund Daniel
1560–1576 John Ellis
1577–1593 John Watkins
1593–1607 Charles Langford
1607–1616 Edward Doughtie
1616–1617 Richard Montagu
(exchanged with Lloyd)
1617 Oliver Lloyd
1617–1624 Silvanus Griffiths
1623–1631 Daniel Price
1631–1636 John Richardson
1637–1643 Jonathan Browne
1644–1661 Herbert Croft
1661–1672 Thomas Hodges
1672–1692 George Benson
1692–1706 John Tyler
(afterwards Bishop of Llandaff 1706)
1706 Robert Clavering

1729–1736 John Harris
1736–1748 Edward Cresset
(afterwards Bishop of Llandaff 1748)
1749 Edmund Castle
1750–1756 John Egerton
1756 Francis Webber
Nathan Wetherell

Late modern
1808 William Leigh
1809-1820 George Gretton
1820 Robert Carr
1827 Edward Mellish
1831 Edward Grey
1832 John Merewether
1850–1867 Richard Dawes
1867–1894 George Herbert
1894–1919 Wentworth Leigh
1919–1946 Reginald Waterfield
1947–1961 Hedley Burrows
1961–1968 Robert Price
1969–1981 Norman Rathbone
1982–1992 Peter Haynes
1993–2000 Robert Willis
200228 February 2021 Michael Tavinor
1 March 2021October 2021 Andrew Piper, Precentor and Acting Dean
2 October 2021present: Sarah Brown

Sources
British History Online – Fasti Ecclesiae Anglicanae 1066–1300 – Deans of Hereford
British History Online – Fasti Ecclesiae Anglicanae 1300–1541 – Deans of Hereford
:s: Page:Fasti ecclesiae Anglicanae Vol.1 body of work.djvu/519
:s: Page:Fasti ecclesiae Anglicanae Vol.1 body of work.djvu/520
:s: Page:Fasti ecclesiae Anglicanae Vol.1 body of work.djvu/521

References

 
Deans of Hereford
Dean of Hereford